Alma Inga Kristina Sarri (née Jonsson; 7 August 1934 – 14 April 2021) was a Swedish actress. She was the mother of actor Olle Sarri.

Filmography
1956 – My Passionate Longing 
1956 – Sista paret ut
1965 – En historia till fredag (TV-series)
1971 – Lavforsen – by i Norrland (TV-series)
1983 – Mot härliga tider
1985 – Det är mänskligt att fela (TV)
1986 – Bröderna Mozart
1988 – Livsfarlig film
1992 – Hassel – Utpressarna (TV)
1993 – Roseanna
1994 – Min vän Percys magiska gymnastikskor (TV-series)
1994 – Svensson Svensson (TV-series)
1999 – c/o Segemyhr (TV-series)
2001 – Vintergatan 5b (TV-series)
2002 – Bella bland kryddor och kriminella (TV-series)
2003 – Tillbaka till Vintergatan (TV-series)
2008 – Varg
2009 – Äntligen midsommar
2020 – We Got This (TV-series)

References

External links 

Swedish actors
Swedish television actresses
1934 births

2021 deaths